TUX is a Hong Kong alternative rock band formed in September 2012. The four-member group consists of Dawn (Vocal, Synthesizer, Guitar), Victor (Guitar), Kevin (Bass) and Tak (Drums).  They have a shoegazing sound, blended with psychedelic and pop elements.

The band released a self-titled EP in November 2013. TUX is now preparing a second album for a projected 2016 release, according to the band's website. The band has been active in the music scene, having performed in many venues in and around Hong Kong as well Taipei, and are on the schedule for the 2015 Clockenflap festival.

History
The founding members of TUX, Dawn and Victor, were schoolmates at the Chinese University of Hong Kong. Dawn decided to start a band and went to Victor, whom she met in a school club, and they began writing songs at school. Victor later became the guitarist of the band. After collaborating on a song called "Nothing To You", which was later included on their first EP, the idea was accepted. They met Kevin, Ajax and Cat, with whom they found a shared interest in music, and the latter two joined the initial band. The band took off in September 2012, named with the simplified form of the Tuxedo Cat in memory of a pet once kept by Dawn, whose sudden death saddened her. The image of the cat also appears on the cover of their first EP, floating in a heaven-like blue. The image is also used on their website.

In November 2013, one year after the band formed, TUX released their first EP TUX. It consists of six tracks, one of which, "Yellow Pills", was later made to a music video.  Dawn has stated, "We are trying to make songs that sound underwater—like you are swimming in the sea alone." The launch was celebrated with gigs on 2 and 23 November.

In 2014, due to personal reasons, the band broke-up for about one year. Dawn and Victor re-formed TUX in the beginning of 2015 with Kevin (bass guitar) and Tak (percussion) joining the line-up.  A second album by TUX is scheduled for release in 2016.

Music Style

Influenced by The Cardigans, Tux tries to produce a contrast between brisk up-beat pop and lyrics with a deeper, darker core. Dawn describes this as "sadness wrapped with sugar" and the manner that she fakes her way through the helplessness of what can happen in life.  Like many indie groups, they claim not to have any "programmed elements" and to be unrestrained by genres.

Shashwati Kala of the UndergroundHK commented, "In all, they put me in mind of the mood of The Smashing Pumpkins' "Drown" mixed with some 70s dance-rock and 80s synth-rock [...] There are times when this mix gets a little lost in itself, and can be stuck in the doldrums a bit, such that it feels like the song doesn't know where to go and things go a bit flat."

Band members

Past members
Ajax: Bass
Cat: Drums

Discography
TUX EP (2013)
"Intro"
"Yellow Pills"
"Over The Sea"
"Intermission"
"Nothing to You"
"One Man Island"

Videography

"Nothing to You" (2013)
"Yellow Pills" (2013)

References

Hong Kong musical groups